Inga Peulich (née Došen; born 15 October 1956) is an Australian politician. She was a member of the Legislative Council representing South Eastern Metropolitan Region from 2006 to 2018. From 2014 to 2018, Peulich served as the Victorian Liberal Party's Shadow Minister for Multicultural Affairs and Shadow Minister for Scrutiny of Government.

Biography
Inga Peulich is of Bosnian heritage, being born Inga Došen in Bosnia and Herzegovina and migrating to Australia in 1967 with her family. 

Peulich has a Bachelor of Arts and a master's degree in education. Before her election as the Liberal Member for Bentleigh in the Victorian Legislative Assembly, Peulich taught VCE English and Psychology, and was English faculty head in a large government school in the south-east region of Melbourne.

Political career
In 1989, Inga Peulich joined the Moorabbin branch of the Liberal Party and a year later was elected to the Moorabbin City Council. She was a Liberal member of the Victorian Legislative Assembly from 1992 to 2002, representing the electorate of Bentleigh. She was one of many Liberal members elected in Jeff Kennett's landslide win at the 1992 election.  In 1992, Peulich expressed opposition to aspects of the proposed expansion of Westfield Southland.

Peulich lost her seat at the 2002 election, but returned to parliament at the 2006 election, being elected to the Legislative Council as one of the members for South Eastern Metropolitan Region. She was re-elected to the Legislative Council in 2010 and 2014.

Following various parliamentary committee appointments, Peulich was promoted to Shadow Parliamentary Secretary for Education and Communities in February 2008.  Following the election of the Baillieu Liberal/National Coalition at the 2010 Victorian state election, Peulich was appointed Secretary to Liberal Parliamentary Party and Coalition, and in March 2013, was promoted to Parliamentary Secretary for Education.

Following the 2010 State election, Peulich was credited with playing a significant role in winning a swag of south-east metropolitan "sandbelt" seats to secure a narrow win for the Victorian Liberal/ National Coalition Government.

In March 2014, Peulich became Cabinet Secretary in the Napthine Ministry.

Peulich is considered a 'conservative' member of the Liberal Party  In 2017, she opposed the trial of a safe injecting room in Richmond, and assisted dying legislation.

Following the defeat of the Liberal-National coalition government at the 2014 Victorian State election, Peulich was appointed to the shadow cabinet as the Shadow Minister for Multicultural Affairs and Scrutiny of Government, a position she remained in until her electoral defeat.
Peulich lost her seat at the 2018 Victorian election when the Liberal Party vote fell to 28% in the South East Metropolitan region.

Controversies

LGBT youth
Peulich has raised ire of some sections of Victorian society for her stance against initiatives such as the Safe Schools Program and certain rights for same-sex couples. In a 2017 edition of the Quarterly Essay, Peulich was cited as stating that the Safe Schools programme was "frightening", and that it cultivated in children "an isolation from their own families and their own values".

Multiculturalism 
In 2007, Peulich employed 'race blogger' Gary Anderton, himself of mixed race and with aboriginal family members, as an adviser. On his blog in 2004, he had published material that 'declared that Aborigines are congenitally drunk and violent [and] terror suspect David Hicks should be executed.'

In 2016, Peulich was called a 'racist' by a Liberal Party Member, who later withdrew the claim and made a public apology to Peulich.

In 2018, Peulich labelled Victorian Greens MP Samantha Ratnam a "pig" in the Victorian parliament in a debate about 'increasing gender and cultural diversity in parliaments'.

Post-parliamentary career

In early 2020 Peulich opposed the immediate sacking of Casey Council, made up of 11 councillors, until the investigation into allegations against one councillor by IBAC had been completed. The mayor of the City of Casey prior to its dismissal was Susan Serey, considered a 'protege' of Ms Peulich.

In December 2020 an IBAC hearing into the City of Casey was told Peulich was expected “to “go into bat” on a planning issue in the Frankston LGA during rezoning application, in 2014.  The rezoning proposal in question was eventually declined by the planning minister and there was no suggestion by IBAC of any impropriety by Peulich.

Family and personal life

Peulich's husband Savo, son Paul, and mother Nena Dosen, all ran as candidates at the 2003 election for the Glen Eira City Council.[9] In 2008, Paul was elected to the Kingston City Council and served as Mayor of Kingston for 2013–2014.

In 2012 and 2013, a number of articles were run in The Age newspaper accusing Peulich of intervening directly on behalf of her son in his mayoral bid.

In 2020, Peulich's husband, Savo, unsuccessfully ran for election in Caruana Ward of the City of Kingston, gaining 14% of the primary vote.

References

External links
 Parliamentary voting record of Inga Peulich at Victorian Parliament Tracker
of Inga Peulich

1956 births
Australian people of Bosnia and Herzegovina descent
Living people
Members of the Victorian Legislative Assembly
Members of the Victorian Legislative Council
Members of the Victorian Legislative Council for South Eastern Metropolitan Region
Monash University alumni
Liberal Party of Australia members of the Parliament of Victoria
Victoria (Australia) local councillors
Australian schoolteachers
Yugoslav emigrants to Australia
Women members of the Victorian Legislative Council
Women members of the Victorian Legislative Assembly
Women local councillors in Australia